Marine Operational Test and Evaluation Squadron One (VMX-1) is a United States Marine Corps operational test squadron consisting of multiple aircraft types. The squadron is based at Marine Corps Air Station Yuma, Arizona. VMX-22 stood up in August 2003 and was redesignated VMX-1 in May 2016. VMX-1 conducts operational test under the authority of the Commander, Operational Test and Evaluation Force (COMOPTEVFOR) and the Director, Marine Corps Operational Test and Evaluation Activity (MCOTEA) depending on the program under test.

Mission

VMX-1 is an independent test organization which conducts operational testing under the authority of COMOPTEVFOR or MCOTEA and administrative control of the Deputy Commandant for Aviation with the charter to:

 Conducts Operational Test and Evaluation of U.S. Marine Corps fixed-wing, tiltrotor, and rotary-wing aircraft, Unmanned Aerial Systems (UAS), and aviation command and control systems under the authority of Commander, Operational Test and Evaluation Force or Director, Marine Corps Operational Test and Evaluation Activity 
Support concept development
Assist in creating Marine Aviation tactics, techniques, and procedures through experimentation 
Support tactical demonstrations 
Provide operational support as directed by the Deputy Commandant for Aviation

History
Flight-testing of the MV-22 Osprey was delayed in the aftermath of the two incidents in 2000 and resumed in May 2002 to address the mechanical issues raised by these accidents. Included in the now on-going testing process is a rigorous, strictly regimented inspection process to verify and validate all of the aircraft’s modifications and clearances. The Integrated Test Team at Naval Air Station Patuxent River, Edwards Air Force Base, VMX-22, and the Bell Helicopter facility in Amarillo, Texas, have flown more than 4600 hours in the MV-22.

Since the MV-22 is neither a fixed-wing nor rotary-wing platform, it has a unique designation as a tiltrotor. The aeromechanics, composite structure, maintenance concepts, and concept of deployment are inherently unique and best addressed in a squadron solely focused on tiltrotor operational testing.

On July 11, 2014, Marines from VMX-22 accompanied  on her maiden voyage from Mississippi, en route to her homeport in San Diego, California.

In June 2015, the Command Element and MV-22 component relocated to Marine Corps Air Station Yuma from Marine Corps Air Station New River.

In August 2015, the Light Attack (UH-1Y, AH-1W, and AH-1Z) component and the Aviation Command and Control component relocated to Marine Corps Air Station Yuma from Naval Air Weapons Station China Lake and Camp Pendleton, CA, respectively.

On May 13, 2016 VMX-22 was re-designated as VMX-1.

In October 2019, the F-35B Testing Detachment stationed on Edwards Air Force Base, California moved to MCAS Yuma, Arizona.

See also

 List of United States Marine Corps aircraft squadrons
 United States Marine Corps Aviation

References

External links
Marine Test and Evaluation Squadron 1

Photographs

Tiltrotor squadrons of the United States Marine Corps
Military units and formations established in 2003